Whetstone is a surname. Notable people with the surname include:

 George Whetstone (1544?–1587), English dramatist and author
 Peter Whetstone, American pioneer
 Rachel Whetstone (born 1968), public relations specialist
 William Whetstone (died 1711), British Royal Navy officer